HR 1614 (284 G. Eridani, GJ 183) is a star in the constellation Eridanus. Based upon parallax measurements, it is about  distant from the Earth. It is a main sequence star with a stellar classification of K3V. The chromosphere has an effective temperature of about 4,945 K, which gives this star the orange hue characteristic of K-type stars. It has about 84% of the Sun's mass and 78% of the Sun's radius.

It is considered a metal-rich dwarf star, which means it displays an unusually high portion of elements heavier than helium in its spectrum. This metallicity is given in term of the ratio of iron to hydrogen, as compared to the Sun. In the case of HR 1614, this ratio is about 90% higher than the Sun. The activity cycle for this star is 11.1 years in length. Based upon gyrochronology, the estimated age of this star is 4.5 Gyr.

This system is a member of a moving group of at least nine stars that share a common motion through space. The members of this group display the same abundance of heavy elements as does HR 1614, which may indicate a common origin for these stars. The space velocity of this group relative to the Sun is 59 km/s. The estimated age of this group is 2 Gyr, suggesting a corresponding age for this star.

See also
 List of star systems within 25–30 light-years

References

External links
 
 

Eridanus (constellation)
032147
023311
1614
K-type main-sequence stars
Eridani, 284
Durchmusterung objects
0183